Ronan Parke is the debut studio album by English singer Ronan Parke. It was released in the UK on 24 October 2011. The album consisted mostly of cover songs.

Background
Parke revealed on his Facebook page on 31 August that the official video for "A Thousand Miles", the first track from the album, would be released on 12 September, with the lyric video being released on 2 September. The video also revealed that "Forget You" and "Feeling Good" would be on the album amongst others.

It was reported in The Sun on 6 September that Gary Barlow had penned a track for the album called "Stronger Than I Am". Fellow BGT finalist Paul Gbegbaje provided piano backing on "A Thousand Miles".

Promotion
During 2011, Parke appeared on:
T4 on the Beach – 10 July, performing "Forget You";
QVC – 10 October, performing "Feeling Good" and "A Thousand Miles";
This Morning – 18 October, performing ″The Edge of Glory″;
BBC Breakfast – 21 October, performing "The Edge of Glory";
The CBBC show Sam & Mark's Big Friday Wind-Up – 21 October, performing "A Thousand Miles";
Blue Peter – 24 October, performing "A Thousand Miles", with Barney Harwood providing piano backing;
The Alan Titchmarsh Show – 25 October, performing "Feeling Good";
OK! TV – 28 October.

Singles
"A Thousand Miles", originally by Vanessa Carlton, is the first and lead single from the album. The music video, which premiered on 14 September, features Parke against various coloured backgrounds, with lyrics from the track appearing on the screen. The track was also released on 24 October.

Track listing

Charts

Release history

References

2011 debut albums